The Gatlin Brothers Southwest Senior Classic was a golf tournament on the Senior PGA Tour (now PGA Tour Champions) from 1989 to 1990. It was played in Abilene, Texas at the Fairway Oaks Country Club. It replaced the Southwest Golf Classic on the PGA Tour, which had been played from 1981 to 1988 at the same course.

In the inaugural event, George Archer won in a playoff over Orville Moody and Jimmy Powell. Archer had turned 50 just two weeks before and this was his debut Senior PGA Tour event. In the tournament's second and final year, Bruce Crampton won by four strokes over Lee Trevino.

Winners

Source:

References

Former PGA Tour Champions events
Golf in Texas
Recurring sporting events established in 1989
Recurring sporting events disestablished in 1990
1989 establishments in Texas
1990 disestablishments in Texas